Works by the Bohemian composer Franz Benda (1709-1786). They are classified by "L" numbers according to the catalogue of Douglas A. Lee.

Symphonies 
 L I:1 \ Symphony No. 1 in C major
 L I:2 \ Symphony No. 2 in C major
 L I:3 \ Symphony No. 3 in D major
 L I:4 \ Symphony No. 4 in D major
 L I:5 \ Symphony No. 5 in F major
 L I:6 \ Symphony No. 6 in G major
 L I:7 \ Symphony No. 7 in G major
 L I:8 \ Symphony No. 8 in A major
 L I:9 \ Symphony No. 9 in B flat major
 L I:10 \ Symphony No.10 in B flat major
 L I:11 \ Symphony No.11 in E flat major
 L I:12 \ Symphony No.12 in F major
 L I:13 \ Symphony No.13 in G major
 L I:14 \ Symphony No.14 in A major
 L I:15 \ Symphony in C major
 L I:16 \ Symphony in F major
 L I:17 \ Symphony in G major

Concertos 
 L II:1 \ Violin Concerto in C major
 L II:2 \ Violin Concerto in D major
 L II:3 \ Violin Concerto in D major
 L II:4 \ Violin Concerto in D minor
 L II:5 \ Violin Concerto in E flat major
 L II:6 \ Violin Concerto in E major
 L II:7 \ Violin Concerto in E major (mostly lost)
 L II:8 \ Violin Concerto in E major
 L II:9 \ Violin Concerto in F major
 L II:10 \ Violin Concerto in G major
 L II:11 \ Flute Concerto in G major
 L II:12 \ Violin Concerto in A flat major
 L II:13 \ Violin Concerto in A major
 L II:14 \ Violin Concerto in A major
 L II:15 \ Violin Concerto in A major
 L II:16 \ Flute Concerto in A minor
 L II:17 \ Violin Concerto in B flat major
 L II:18 \ Violin Concerto in B flat major
 L II:19 \ Violin Concerto in C major (Georg Benda)
 L II:20 \ Violin Concerto in B flat major (Joseph Riepel)
 L II:21 \ Violin Concerto in B flat major (Johann Benda)
 L II:22 \ Violin Concerto in G major (Johann Gottlieb Graun)
 L II:23 \ Violin Concerto in E major (lost)
 L II:24 \ Violin Concerto in E minor (lost)
 L II:25 \ Violin Concerto in G major (lost)
 L II:26 \ Violin Concerto in B flat major (lost)
 L II:27 \ Violin Concerto in B flat major (lost)
 L II:28 \ Violin Concerto in B minor (lost)

Sonatas for instrument & basso continuo 
 L III:1 \ Violin Sonata Op. 1 No.3 in C major
 L III:2 \ Violin Sonata in C major
 L III:3 \ Violin Sonata in C major
 L III:4 \ Violin Sonata in C major
 L III:5 \ Violin Sonata in C major
 L III:6 \ Flute Sonata in C major
 L III:7 \ Violin Sonata in C major
 L III:8 \ Violin Sonata in C minor
 L III:9 \ Violin Sonata in C minor
 L III:10 \ Violin Sonata in C minor
 L III:11 \ Violin Sonata in C minor
 L III:12 \ Violin Sonata in C minor
 L III:13 \ Violin Sonata in C minor
 L III:14 \ Violin Sonata in C minor
 L III:15 \ Violin Sonata in C minor
 L III:16 \ Violin Sonata in D major
 L III:17 \ Violin Sonata in D major
 L III:18 \ Violin Sonata in D major
 L III:19 \ Violin Sonata in D major
 L III:20 \ Violin Sonata in D major
 L III:21 \ Violin Sonata in D major
 L III:22 \ Flute Sonata in D major
 L III:23 \ Violin Sonata in D major
 L III:24 \ Flute Sonata in D major
 L III:25 \ Violin Sonata in D major
 L III:26 \ Violin Sonata in D major
 L III:27 \ Violin Sonata in D major
 L III:28 \ Violin Sonata in D major
 L III:29 \ Violin Sonata in D minor
 L III:30 \ Violin Sonata in D minor
 L III:31 \ Violin Sonata in D minor
 L III:32 \ Violin Sonata in D minor
 L III:33 \ Violin Sonata in E flat major
 L III:34 \ Violin Sonata in E flat major
 L III:35 \ Violin Sonata in E flat major
 L III:36 \ Violin Sonata in E flat major
 L III:37 \ Violin Sonata in E flat major
 L III:38 \ Violin Sonata in E flat major
 L III:39 \ Violin Sonata in E flat major
 L III:40 \ Violin Sonata in E flat major
 L III:41 \ Violin Sonata in E flat major
 L III:42 \ Violin Sonata in E flat major
 L III:43 \ Violin Sonata in E flat major
 L III:44 \ Violin Sonata in E major
 L III:45 \ Violin Sonata in E major
 L III:46 \ Violin Sonata in E major
 L III:47 \ Violin Sonata Op. 1 No.1 in E major
 L III:48 \ Violin Sonata in E major
 L III:49 \ Violin Sonata in E major
 L III:50 \ Violin Sonata in E major
 L III:51 \ Violin Sonata Op. 1 No.5 in E major
 L III:52 \ Violin Sonata in E major
 L III:53 \ Violin Sonata in E major
 L III:54 \ Violin Sonata in E major
 L III:55 \ Violin Sonata in E major
 L III:56 \ Flute Sonata in E minor
 L III:57 \ Flute Sonata in E minor
 L III:58 \ Violin Sonata in E minor
 L III:59 \ Violin Sonata in E minor
 L III:60 \ Violin Sonata in E minor
 L III:61 \ Violin Sonata in E minor
 L III:62 \ Violin Sonata in F major
 L III:63 \ Violin Sonata in F major
 L III:64 \ Violin Sonata in F major
 L III:65 \ Violin Sonata in F major
 L III:66 \ Violin Sonata in F major
 L III:67 \ Violin Sonata in F major
 L III:68 \ Violin Sonata in F major
 L III:69 \ Violin Sonata in F major
 L III:70 \ Violin Sonata in F major
 L III:71 \ Violin Sonata in F major
 L III:72 \ Violin Sonata in F major
 L III:73 \ Violin Sonata in F minor
 L III:74 \ Violin Sonata in G major
 L III:75 \ Violin Sonata in G major
 L III:76 \ Violin Sonata in G major
 L III:77 \ Violin Sonata in G major
 L III:78 \ Violin Sonata in G major
 L III:79 \ Violin Sonata in G major
 L III:80 \ Violin Sonata in G major
 L III:81 \ Violin Sonata in G major
 L III:82 \ Violin Sonata in G major
 L III:83 \ Violin Sonata in G major
 L III:84 \ Violin Sonata in G major
 L III:85 \ Violin Sonata in G major
 L III:86 \ Violin Sonata in G major
 L III:87 \ Violin Sonata in G major
 L III:88 \ Violin Sonata in G major
 L III:89 \ Violin Sonata in G minor
 L III:90 \ Violin Sonata in G minor
 L III:91 \ Violin Sonata in G minor
 L III:92 \ Violin Sonata in A flat major
 L III:93 \ Violin Sonata in A major
 L III:94 \ Violin Sonata in A major
 L III:95 \ Violin Sonata Op. 1 No.6 in A major
 L III:96 \ Violin Sonata in A major
 L III:97 \ Violin Sonata in A major
 L III:98 \ Violin Sonata Op. 1 No.2 in A major
 L III:99 \ Violin Sonata in A major
 L III:100 \ Violin Sonata in A major
 L III:101 \ Violin Sonata in A major
 L III:102 \ Violin Sonata in A major
 L III:103 \ Violin Sonata in A major
 L III:104 \ Violin Sonata in A major
 L III:105 \ Violin Sonata in A major
 L III:106 \ Violin Sonata in A major
 L III:107 \ Violin Sonata in A major
 L III:108 \ Violin Sonata in A major
 L III:109 \ Violin Sonata in A major
 L III:110 \ Violin Sonata in A major
 L III:111 \ Violin Sonata in A major
 L III:112 \ Violin Sonata in A major
 L III:113 \ Violin Sonata in A major
 L III:114 \ Violin Sonata in A major
 L III:115 \ Violin Sonata in A major
 L III:116 \ Violin Sonata in A minor
 L III:117 \ Violin Sonata in A minor
 L III:118 \ Violin Sonata in A minor
 L III:119 \ Violin Sonata in A minor
 L III:120 \ Violin Sonata in A minor
 L III:121 \ Violin Sonata Op. 1 No.4 in A minor
 L III:122 \ Violin Sonata in A minor
 L III:123 \ Violin Sonata in B flat major
 L III:124 \ Violin Sonata in B flat major
 L III:125 \ Violin Sonata in B flat major
 L III:126 \ Violin Sonata in B flat major
 L III:127 \ Violin Sonata in B flat major
 L III:128 \ Violin Sonata in B flat major
 L III:129 \ Violin Sonata in B flat major
 L III:130 \ Violin Sonata in B flat major
 L III:131 \ Violin Sonata in B flat major
 L III:132 \ Violin Sonata in B flat major
 L III:133 \ Violin Sonata in B flat major
 L III:134 \ Violin Sonata in B flat major
 L III:135 \ Violin Sonata in B flat major
 L III:136 \ Violin Sonata in B flat major
 L III:137 \ Violin Sonata in B flat major
 L III:138 \ Violin Sonata in B flat minor
 L III:139 \ Violin Sonata in B minor
 L III:140 \ Violin Sonata in C major
 L III:141 \ Violin Sonata in D major
 L III:142 \ Flute Sonata in D major
 L III:143 \ Violin Sonata in D major
 L III:144 \ Violin Sonata in E flat major
 L III:145 \ Violin Sonata in E flat major
 L III:146 \ Violin Sonata in E major
 L III:147 \ Violin Sonata in F major
 L III:148 \ Violin Sonata in G major
 L III:149 \ Violin Sonata in G major
 L III:150 \ Violin Sonata in G minor
 L III:151 \ Violin Sonata in G minor
 L III:152 \ Violin Sonata in A major
 L III:153 \ Violin Sonata in A major
 L III:154 \ Violin Sonata in A major
 L III:155 \ Violin Sonata in A major
 L III:156 \ Oboe Sonata in B flat major
 L III:157 \ Violin Sonata in B flat major
 L III:158 \ Violin Sonata in B flat major
 L III:159 \ Violin Sonata in B flat major
 L III:160 \ Sonata for keyboard & flute Op. 5 No.2 in C major
 L III:161 \ Sonata for keyboard & flute Op. 5 No.3 in E major
 L III:162 \ Sonata for keyboard & flute Op. 5 No.1 in F major
 L III:163 \ Violin Sonata in G major (Friedrich Ludwig Benda)
 L III:164 \ Violin Sonata in A major (Joseph Benda)
 L III:165 \ Violin Sonata in F major (lost)
 L III:166 \ Violin Sonata in A major (lost)
 L III:167 \ Violin Sonata in A minor (lost)
 L III:168 \ Violin Sonata in C minor (lost)
 L III:169 \ Violin Sonata in D major (lost)
 L III:170 \ Flute Sonata in D major (lost)
 L III:171 \ Violin Sonata in D major (lost)
 L III:172 \ Oboe Sonata in D minor (lost)
 L III:173 \ Violin Sonata in E flat major (lost)
 L III:174 \ Bassoon Sonata in F major (lost)
 L III:175 \ Violin Sonata in A major (lost)
 L III:176 \ Violin Sonata in A major (lost)
 L III:177 \ Violin Sonata in A major (lost)
 L III:178 \ Violin Sonata in A major (lost)
 L III:179 \ Violin Sonata in A minor (lost)
 L III:180 \ Oboe Sonata in B flat major (lost)
 L III:181 \ Bassoon Sonata in B flat major (lost)
 L III:182 \ Bassoon Sonata in B flat major (lost)

Trio sonatas 
 L IV:1 \ Sonata for 2 flutes & continuo in G major
 L IV:2 \ Sonata for 2 violins & continuo in A major
 L IV:3 \ Sonata for 2 violins & continuo in D major (Graun)
 L IV:4 \ Sonata for 2 violins & continuo in G major (Graun)
 L IV:5 \ Sonata for violin, keyboard & continuo in D major (lost)
 L IV:6 \ Sonata for violin, bassoon & continuo in F major (lost)
 L IV:7 \ Sonata for flute & keyboard obligato in G major
 L IV:8 \ Sonata for violin, flute & continuo in G major (lost)
 L IV:9 \ Sonata for 2 violins & continuo in B flat major (lost)
 L IV:10 \ Sonata for violin & keyboard in B flat major (lost)

Duets for 2 violins 
 L V:1 \ Violins Duet No. 1 in C major
 L V:2 \ Violins Duet No. 5 in C major
 L V:3 \ Violins Duet No. 2 in C major
 L V:4 \ Violins Duet No. 8 in C major
 L V:5 \ Violins Duet No.11 in C major
 L V:6 \ Violins Duet No. 4 in C major
 L V:7 \ Violins Duet No. 9 in C major
 L V:8 \ Violins Duet No. 3 in C major
 L V:9 \ Violins Duet No.22 in C minor
 L V:10 \ Violins Duet No.21 in C minor
 L V:11 \ Violins Duet No.19 in D major
 L V:12 \ Violins Duet No.20 in D major
 L V:13 \ Violins Duet No.18 in D minor
 L V:14 \ Violins Duet No.13 in E minor
 L V:15 \ Violins Duet No.17 in F major
 L V:16 \ Violins Duet No.10 in G major
 L V:17 \ Violins Duet No.16 in G major
 L V:18 \ Violins Duet No.12 in G major
 L V:19 \ Violins Duet No. 6 in G major
 L V:20 \ Violins Duet No. 7 in G major
 L V:21 \ Violins Duet No.14 in A minor
 L V:22 \ Violins Duet No.15 in A minor
 L V:23 \ Violins Duet in C major
 L V:24 \ Violins Duet in C major
 L V:25 \ Violins Duet in C major
 L V:26 \ Violins Duet in E flat major
 L V:27 \ Violins Duet in E minor
 L V:28 \ Violins Duet in F major
 L V:29 \ Violins Duet in F major
 L V:30 \ Violins Duet in G major
 L V:31 \ Violins Duet in A minor

Solo violin pieces 
 L VI:1 \ Violin Capriccio No.62 in C major
 L VI:2 \ Violin Capriccio No. 1 in C major
 L VI:3 \ Violin Capriccio No.39 in C major
 L VI:4 \ Violin Capriccio No.69 in C minor
 L VI:5 \ Violin Capriccio No. 6 in C minor
 L VI:6 \ Violin Capriccio No.48 in C minor
 L VI:7 \ Violin Capriccio No.61 in C minor
 L VI:8 \ Violin Capriccio No.70 in C minor
 L VI:9 \ Violin Capriccio No.41 in C minor
 L VI:10 \ Violin Capriccio No.18 in C sharp major
 L VI:11 \ Violin Capriccio No.20 in D flat major
 L VI:12 \ Violin Capriccio No.15 in C sharp minor
 L VI:13 \ Violin Capriccio No.42 in D major
 L VI:14 \ Violin Capriccio No. 4 in D major
 L VI:15 \ Violin Capriccio in D major (fragment)
 L VI:16 \ Violin Capriccio No.92 in D major
 L VI:17 \ Violin Capriccio No.94 in D major
 L VI:18 \ Violin Capriccio No.25 in D minor
 L VI:19 \ Violin Capriccio No.30 in E flat major
 L VI:20 \ Violin Capriccio No.28 in E flat major
 L VI:21 \ Violin Capriccio No.65 in E flat major
 L VI:22 \ Violin Capriccio No.91 in E flat major
 L VI:23 \ Violin Capriccio No. 7 in E flat major
 L VI:24 \ Violin Capriccio No.90 in E flat major
 L VI:25 \ Violin Capriccio No.64 in E flat major
 L VI:26 \ Violin Capriccio No.36 in E flat minor
 L VI:27 \ Violin Capriccio No.34 in E major
 L VI:28 \ Violin Capriccio No.14 in E major
 L VI:29 \ Violin Capriccio No.13 in E minor
 L VI:30 \ Violin Capriccio No.71 in F major
 L VI:31 \ Violin Capriccio No.33 in F major
 L VI:32 \ Violin Capriccio No.24 in F major
 L VI:33 \ Violin Capriccio No.29 in F major
 L VI:34 \ Violin Capriccio No.95 in F major
 L VI:35 \ Violin Capriccio No.72 in F major
 L VI:36 \ Violin Capriccio No.27 in F minor
 L VI:37 \ Violin Capriccio No.93 in F minor
 L VI:38 \ Violin Capriccio No.96 in F minor
 L VI:39 \ Violin Capriccio No.22 in F minor
 L VI:40 \ Violin Capriccio No.17 in F sharp major
 L VI:41 \ Violin Capriccio No.37 in G flat major
 L VI:42 \ Violin Capriccio No.16 in F sharp minor
 L VI:43 \ Violin Capriccio in G major
 L VI:44 \ Violin Capriccio No.51 in G major
 L VI:45 \ Violin Capriccio No.11 in G major
 L VI:46 \ Violin Capriccio No.12 in G major
 L VI:47 \ Violin Capriccio in G major
 L VI:48 \ Violin Capriccio No.35 in G major
 L VI:49 \ Violin Capriccio No.89 in G minor
 L VI:50 \ Violin Capriccio No.40 in G minor
 L VI:51 \ Violin Capriccio No. 8 in G minor
 L VI:52 \ Violin Capriccio No.38 in A major
 L VI:53 \ Violin Capriccio No. 9 in A major
 L VI:54 \ Violin Capriccio No.26 in A major
 L VI:55 \ Violin Capriccio No.31 in A major
 L VI:56 \ Violin Capriccio No.98 in A major
 L VI:57 \ Violin Capriccio No.97 in A major
 L VI:58 \ Violin Capriccio No.10 in A major
 L VI:59 \ Violin Capriccio No. 3 in A minor
 L VI:60 \ Violin Capriccio No.21 in A minor
 L VI:61 \ Violin Capriccio No. 2 in A minor
 L VI:62 \ Violin Capriccio No.23 in B flat major
 L VI:63 \ Violin Capriccio No.32 in B flat major
 L VI:64 \ Violin Capriccio No.57 in B flat major
 L VI:65 \ Violin Capriccio No.47 in B flat major
 L VI:66 \ Violin Capriccio No.19 in B flat minor
 L VI:67 \ Violin Capriccio No. 5 in B minor
 L VI:68 \ Violin Capriccio in G major
 L VI:69 \ Violin Capriccio in G major
 L VI:70 \ Violin Capriccio No.59 in C major (lost)
 L VI:71 \ Violin Capriccio No.84 in C major (lost)
 L VI:72 \ Violin Capriccio No.75 in C major (lost)
 L VI:73 \ Violin Capriccio No.68 in C major (lost)
 L VI:74 \ Violin Capriccio No.83 in C major (lost)
 L VI:75 \ Violin Capriccio No.60 in C major (lost)
 L VI:76 \ Violin Capriccio No.55a in D major (lost)
 L VI:77 \ Violin Capriccio No.81 in D major (lost)
 L VI:78 \ Violin Capriccio No.80 in D major (lost)
 L VI:79 \ Violin Capriccio No.74 in D major (lost)
 L VI:80 \ Violin Capriccio No.78 in D major (lost)
 L VI:81 \ Violin Capriccio No.56 in D major (lost)
 L VI:82 \ Violin Capriccio No.66 in D minor (lost)
 L VI:83 \ Violin Capriccio No.58 in E flat major (lost)
 L VI:84 \ Violin Capriccio No.67 in E minor (lost)
 L VI:85 \ Violin Capriccio No.53 in E minor (lost)
 L VI:86 \ Violin Capriccio No.63 in F major (lost)
 L VI:87 \ Violin Capriccio No.50 in F minor (lost)
 L VI:88 \ Violin Capriccio No.82 in G major (lost)
 L VI:89 \ Violin Capriccio No.79 in G major (lost)
 L VI:90 \ Violin Capriccio No.73 in G major (lost)
 L VI:91 \ Violin Capriccio No.76 in G major (lost)
 L VI:92 \ Violin Capriccio No.52 in G minor (lost)
 L VI:93 \ Violin Capriccio No.54 in G minor (lost)
 L VI:94 \ Violin Capriccio No.44 in A major (lost)
 L VI:95 \ Violin Capriccio No.49 in A major (lost)
 L VI:96 \ Violin Capriccio No.88 in A major (lost)
 L VI:97 \ Violin Capriccio No.43 in A major (lost)
 L VI:98 \ Violin Capriccio No.46 in A minor (lost)
 L VI:99 \ Violin Capriccio No.55 in B flat major (lost)
 L VI:100 \ Violin Capriccio No.77 in B flat major (lost)
 L VI:101 \ Violin Capriccio No.86 in B flat major (lost)
 L VI:102 \ Violin Capriccio No.87 in B flat major (lost)
 L VI:103 \ Violin Capriccio No.85 in B flat major (lost)
 L VI:104 \ Violin Capriccio No.45 in B minor (lost)
 L VI:105 \ Violin Capriccio in D major (lost)
 L VI:106 \ Violin Capriccio in E flat major (lost)
 L VI:107 \ Violin Capriccio in A major (lost)
 L VI:108 \ Violin Capriccio in A major (lost)
 L VI:109 \ Violin Capriccio in B flat major (lost)
 L VI:110 \ Violin Capriccio in B flat major (lost)

Miscellaneous works 
 L VII:1 \ Dragonermarsch in D major
 L VII:2 \ Piece for mechanical clock in G major
 L VII:3 \ 3 Odes
 L deest \ Harp Sonata in D major

Lists of compositions by composer
Works by Czech people